Karnataka, a state in South India has a long association with Jainism, a religion which enjoyed patronage of major historic kingdoms in the state such as the Rastrakuta Dynasty, Western Ganga, Kadamba and Chalukya dynasties and the Hoysala Empire. Today the state is home to a number of Jain monuments, such as temples, Gommata statues and stambhas.

History
Historical association of Jainism with Karnataka dates back to the 3rd century BC. Acharya Bhadrabahu predicted a twelve-year-long famine in north India and led the migration of Jain sangha to the south. He was accompanied by his disciple Chandragupta Maurya and the Sangha halted at Chandragiri Hill. Realising that he was nearing the end of his life, Bhadrabahu instructed his disciples to spread the religion and he undertook sallekhana at Chandragiri.

Chandragupta Maurya continued to live on this hill worshipping the foot prints of his teacher and later he too took Sallekhana. There are two monuments on the hill recalling this event, a rock cut cave called Bhadrabahu cave and a structural shrine called the Chandragupta Basadi.

Architecture and monuments

There are a number of monuments relating to the Jain religion in Karnataka. The Jain monuments include smaller shrines, Jain temples (known as Bastis or Basadis), Gommata statues and Sthambas (pillars). Moodabidri is home to the 1000 Pillar Jain temple. The Ganga-Permadi temple at Annigeri in Navalgund taluq received donation of land from mahasamanta Katarsa in 1074 CE for maintenance of charity-houses. Another temple named Samyakratnakara basadi situated at Mugad, Dharwad district received a similar donation some time before 11th century CE.

The most prominent among them are as follows:

Basadis (Bastis)

 Shravanabelagola
 Chandragiri: Chandragupta Basadi, Chamundaraya Basadi, Parshvanatha basadi
 Vindhyagiri (Vindyagiri): Odegal Basadi
 Town: Akkana Basadi, Bhandara Basadi
 Moodabidri- Also known as "Jain Kashi"
 Saavira Kambada Basadi - The 1000 pillar Jain temple
 Guru Basadi
 There are 18 other Basadis in and around Moodabidiri.
 Halebidu
 Basadi complex, Halebidu - 3 Basadis
 Karkala and Gerusoppa
 Chaturmukha Basadi
 Belgaum
Kamal Basadi
 Lakshmeshwara
 Shanka Basadi
 Varanga
 Kere Basadi
 Shantinatha Basadi, Jinanathapura
 Panchakuta Basadi, Kambadahalli
 Chaturmukha Basadi, Gerusoppa
 Chandranatha Basadi, Hadavalli
 Parshvanatha Basadi, Gundwad

Statues of Gommata

Shravanabelagola has the world famous monolithic statue, Gommateshwara statue. Similar Monolithic statues of Lord Bahubali can be also seen in Venur, Dharmasthala, Karkala and Mysore.

There are five monolithic statues of Bahubali in Karnataka measuring more than 20 feet in height.
 57 feet at Shravanabelagola in Hassan District in 981 CE
 42 feet at Karkala in Udupi District in 1432 CE
 39 feet at Dharmasthala in Dakshina Kannada District in 1973 CE
 35 feet at Venur in Dakshina Kannada District in 1604 CE
 20 feet at Gommatagiri in Mysore District in 12th Century CE

In all of the above-mentioned places, the holy festival of Mahamastakabhisheka is held once every 12 years when the statue of Bahubali is worshiped and bathed in holy water, milk, turmeric, and other natural herbs that have their own significant importance.

Jainism in North Karnataka

Jainism in North Karnataka flourished under the Chalukyas, Kadamba and Rashtrakutas, and Vijayanagara empire. Imbued with an intense religious feeling, lavish patronage was extended towards the building of basadis, temples and magnificent statues. Jainism enjoyed the highest repute among the people particularly the ruling classes and the mercantile community thus virtually becoming the state religion.

The earliest dated structure is a Basadi at Halasi built under the Kadamba Dynasty of Banavasi thus laying the foundation for Jain architecture in North Karnataka. Rastrakutas period is the golden age of Jainism in Karnataka. The Jaina monuments of the Rashtrakutas period are found at Pattadakal, Malkhed, Lakshmeshwar, Koppal, Bankur, of North Karnataka. Jainism exerted considerable influence over the cultural life of Karnataka during the rule of the Rashtrakutas.

Kadambas of Banavasi were known to be patrons of Jainism. After the rule of the Kadambas of Banavasi most parts of north Karnataka came under the rule of the early Chalukya or Badami Chalukyas.

The Chalukyas of Badami built cave temples at Badami, Pattadkal and Aihole. Puligere (modern Lakshmeshwara) was a strong centre of religious activities of the Jain monks during this era.

Lakkundi in Gadag District has a large Brahma Jinalaya of Chalukya style, built by a noble lady, Attimabbe.

Navagraha Jain Temple at Varur near Hubli is one of the major pilgrimage. The temple features a 61 feet (18.6 m) tall monolithic idol of the Shri 1008 Bhagavan Parshvanatha and the smaller statues of the other 8 Jain teerthankaras.

Religious organisations

The Dakshin Bharat Jain Sabha is a religious and social service organisation of the Jains of South India. The organisation is headquartered at Kolhapur, Maharashtra, India. The association is credited with being one of the first Jain associations to start reform movements among the Jains in modern India. The organisation mainly seeks to represent the interests of the native Jains of Maharashtra (Marathi Jains), Karnataka (Kannada Jains) and Goa.

List of famous temples 

 Cave temples
 Badami cave temples in Badami
 Aihole cave temple

 Main temples
 Shravanabelagola, a monumental statue of Saint Gomateshwar(Bahubali) in Hassan district.
 Karkala, 1. Hiriyangadi Basadi 2. Chathurmukha Basadi 3. Padmavathi Kere Basadi. The famous monolithic  Gommateshwara statue, the second tallest in Karnataka is also here.
 Dharmasthala, a  Gomateshwara idol.
 Venur, a  Gomateshwara idol.
 Gommatagiri, a  Gomateshwara idol.
 Moodabidri, 18 ancient Jain temple including Saavira Kambada Basadi the Thousand Pillars Temple and Guru Basadi 
 Brahma Jinalaya in Lakkundi
 Humcha Jain temples
 Navagraha Jain Temple in Hubli
 Sankighatta
 Jain Narayana temple, Pattadakal
 Kundadri : It is said this is Samadhi sthal of Acharya Kundakunda
 Chaturmukha Basadi in Karkala
 Akkana Basadi
 Odegal basadi
 Parshvanatha basadi
 Basadi complex, Halebidu : 1. Parshvanatha Basadi 2. Shantinatha Basadi 3. Adinatha Basadi
 Varanga – This is an important Jain centre. The Kere basadi is located in midst of a lake. There are many other basadis too.
 Aihole Jain complex - Meguti Jain temple, Charanthimatha Group of temples, Yoginarayana group and Jain cave temple
 Kanakagiri Jain tirth
 Shanka Basadi & Ananthanatha basadi at Lakshmeshwara
 Chandragupta basadi
 Basadi complex in Shravanabelagola
 Shantinatha Basadi, Jinanathapura
 Panchakuta Basadi, Kambadahalli
 Hadavalli Jain Temple
 Chavundaraya Basadi
 Narasimharajapura
 Kamal Basadi & Chikki Basadi at Belgaum Fort
 Chaturmukha Basadi, Gerusoppa
 Mandaragiri
 Jain Bhattaraka Math at Manyakheta
 Aagam Mandir, Tumkur
 Kamthana Jain temple
 Shri 1008 Adinath Digamber Jin Mandir, Jayanagar, Bangalore
 Shri Mahavira Digambara Jain temple, Chickpet
 Kalya (Kalyana pura)
 Gundwad Jain Basadi
 Kathale Basadi, Barkur
 Sri Parshwanath Swamy Basadi
 Shri Parshwa Sushil Dham, Attibele
 Jain temple inside Hangal Fort, Hubli
 Hampi Jain complex
 Padmabbarasi basadi, Naregal
 Shantinatha Basadi, Kalaghatagi
 Godageri 
 Sargur
 Shri Parshwa Sushil Dham
 Shri 1008 Bhagwan Neminath Digambar Jain Basadi.,Terdal
 Shri khetra Badragiri,Halingali

Notable Karnataka Jains
Rani Chennabhairadevi
 Kumudendu Muni - Author of Siribhoovalaya, a unique multi-lingual literary work.
 Shivakotiacharya
 Chavundaraya- Poet
 Hampa Nagarajaiah
 Mukhyamantri Chandru
 Professor Padmanabh S Jaini
 Veerendra Heggade
 Abhayachandra Jain
 Bhavya
 Rani Abbakka
 Durvinita - king
 Amogavarsha - emperor, Pampa, Ranna,  Ajitprasad,
Justice R.S.Mahendra

Photo gallery

See also 

History of Jainism
Timeline of Jainism
Jainism in North Karnataka
History of Karnataka

External links

 Jainism and Karnataka culture (pdf)

References

Citation

Sources 
 
  
 
 
 

 
Karnataka society
Jain communities
Social groups of Karnataka
History of Karnataka